Conger macrocephalus is an eel in the family Congridae (conger/garden eels). It was described by Robert H. Kanazawa in 1958. It is a marine, deep water-dwelling eel which is known from the Philippines, in the western central Pacific Ocean. It is known to dwell at a depth of 329 metres.

References

Conger
Endemic fauna of the Philippines
Fish of the Philippines
Taxa named by Robert H. Kanazawa
Fish described in 1958